Laurynas Birutis (born 27 August 1997) is a Lithuanian professional basketball player for Žalgiris Kaunas of Lithuanian Basketball League (LKL) and the EuroLeague.

Professional career

BC Zalgiris junior team and debut in LKL 
Birutis started his professional career when he signed with BC Žalgiris-2 in summer 2014. On January 5, 2016, in a match  against BC Petrochema he made a National Basketball League record by rebounding 23 balls. Later, that season he won silver medals with Žalgiris-2, who lost the final game against BC Sūduva.

On 14 April 2017, after dominating in the second-tier National Basketball League with 17.4 points, 9.0 rebounds, 1.4 assists and 2 blocks averages per game, Birutis was invited to join the top-tier Lithuanian Basketball League playoffs team Vytautas Prienai–Birštonas. Birutis powerfully debuted on 15 April 2017 by scoring 17 points and grabbing 4 rebounds, but his team lost 92–89 after Justas Tamulis buzzer-beater. Two days later, he achieved his first 96–89 victory in LKL versus the Neptūnas Klaipėda, and he was second-best Vytautas' scorer with 19 points and 6 rebounds.

BC Šiauliai 
On 1 August 2017, Birutis joined his hometown team BC Šiauliai. During the 2018 Karaliaus Mindaugo taurė quarter-final versus the Lithuanian champions Žalgiris Kaunas, Birutis played his career-best game by scoring 35 points, grabbing 11 rebounds, dishing out 2 assists and blocking one shot, however his team lost 85–78. On 18 April 2018, Birutis entered his name into the 2018 NBA Draft. During his second LKL season, he led all three main statistical lines of his position in the league: 14,9 points, 7,3 rebounds and 1,3 blocks. After his astonishing season, Birutis has received the LKL Most Valuable Player Award. Moreover, with his help BC Šiauliai recovered from having the worst record in the league last season (6–30) and became a solid playoffs participant by finishing in the 5th place during the regular season (16–20). During the season closing ceremony he was also named as the best young player of LKL. It was announced at the end of the season that Birutis would return to Žalgiris for the 2018–2019 season.

BC Žalgiris 
Birutis joined Lithuanian champions BC Žalgiris and had debut in EuroLeague on 12 October 2018 against Saski Baskonia. He scored 7 points in 10 minutes. Birutis struggled all season from start with injury, couldn't practise because of pain, which led to surgery on 14 February 2019. On 1 June he won his first Lietuvos krepšinio lyga title.

BC Prienai 
On 23 November he came back after recovery from injury, and had 9 points and 4 rebounds including game-winning shot in 16 mins in a thrilling win 81:79 against BC Pieno žvaigždės. Later he earned player of the month award in February. He had his best game on 1 February 2020 against BC Neptūnas in which he scored 25 points and gathered 36 efficiency value. In that season he averaged 15,2 points (2nd in the League), 7 rebounds (2nd in the League) and 20,4 efficiency (1st in the League).

Monbus Obradoiro 
On July 24, 2020, he has signed with Monbus Obradoiro of the Spanish Liga ACB. On 28 September 2020, after averaging 19.3 points, 8 rebounds and 1 block per game, Birutis was named Liga ACB MVP of September.

National team career
Laurynas Birutis debuted for the Lithuania men's u-16 basketball team in the 2013 FIBA Europe Under-16 Championship in Ukraine. He won bronze medals with Lithuania men's u-18 basketball team in the 2015 FIBA Europe Under-18 Championship. Birutis, together with his age teammates: Tadas Sedekerskis and Martynas Varnas, was invited to play in the FIBA's Youth All-Star Game during EuroBasket 2015. On February 26, 2018, Birutis debuted as a member of the Lithuania men's national basketball team by scoring 8 points and grabbing 6 rebounds, and helped to crush the Kosovo national basketball team 106–50 during the 2019 FIBA Basketball World Cup qualification.

He had his second chance with Lithuania men's national basketball team in game against Czech Republic men's national basketball team in come-back win 97:89 in EuroBasket 2022 qualification game. He scored 17 points and 3 rebounds in 15 mins and had best +/- value in the team (+20).

Personal life 
Laurynas is the son of former long-term BC Šiauliai player Sigitas Birutis.

References

External links
 FIBA profile

1997 births
Living people
BC Prienai players
BC Šiauliai players
BC Žalgiris players
Centers (basketball)
Liga ACB players
Lithuanian expatriate basketball people in Spain
Lithuanian men's basketball players
Obradoiro CAB players